Peregrine Ilbert (1765 – 26 June 1805) was an Anglican clergyman who was Rector of Farringdon, Devon and Archdeacon of Barnstaple from 1799 to 1805. He was the son of William Ilbert of West Alvington, Devon.

References

Archdeacons of Barnstaple
1805 deaths
1765 births
Alumni of Christ Church, Oxford